Adolfo Viruet (born 29 January 1952 in Hoboken, New Jersey) is a retired Puerto Rican and NABF junior welterweight champion boxer. His brother, Edwin Viruet, was also a professional boxer.

Turned professional on October 30, 1969, at age 18, Viruet was a contender in the light welterweight and welterweight divisions during the late 1970s and early 1980s, fighting such opponents as Roberto Durán, Sugar Ray Leonard, Donald Curry, Bruce Curry, Pete Ranzany and Luis Resto. He retired in 1982 with a final record of 23-6-1.

Viruet is 16-0-0 (5 KO's) as a Light-Welterweight.

Adolfo had long spurts of inactivity, with no bouts from November 1970 thru April 1972, and only 1 bout in 1974. He had no professional boxing activity because of his broken left hand. During this time he was training in his gym in NY and Hoboken NJ.

In August 1975 in Las Vegas -Adolfo 16-0-0 (5 KO's) upset (W Unan Dec 12) United States Light-Welterweight Champion and #3 WBC-ranked - Monroe Brooks, who was 25-1-3 (15 KO's) coming into their contest.

He also was the first trainer of Arturo Gatti.

Adolfo is currently training his godson John Olson to become a professional boxer.

Adolfo's boxing hero was non other than Rocky Marciano, on whom he based his boxing style and work out ethic.

External links 
 

1952 births
Living people
Welterweight boxers
Puerto Rican male boxers